Flowing Wells High School (est. 1954) is a secondary school in Tucson, Arizona. It is the primary high school in the Flowing Wells Unified School District, the other being Sentinel Peak High School.

Curriculum 
Flowing Wells offers several AP courses, including Biology, Psychology, Environmental Science, Chemistry, U.S. History, European History, Macro/Micro Economics, English, Calculus, Spanish, and Statistics. AP Music Theory has also been offered in the past.

The high school also places a high value on arts education and never charges students fees for sports participation.

Flowing Wells awards two different kinds of diplomas, a standard or "blue" diploma matching state graduation requirements, and a "gold" advanced studies diploma. A valedictorian, salutatorian, seniors graduating with distinction, and Arizona Academic Scholars are also recognized upon graduation.

Traditions 
The Flowing Wells High School mascot are the Caballeros (horseman or Mexican gentleman).

Awards 
 In 1968, it won the National Bellamy Award.
 In the 1986–87 school year, it was honored as a Blue Ribbon school.

Notable alumni
 Dominick Cruz – professional mixed martial artist, former UFC Bantamweight Champion
 Mo Elleithee – A political campaign strategist and current executive director of Georgetown Institute of Politics and Public Service
 Marcus Titus – deaf American swimmer who made it as far as eighth place in the 2012 Olympic Trials.

See also
 Flowing Wells Witch Trial

References

Public high schools in Arizona
Schools in Tucson, Arizona
Educational institutions established in 1954
1954 establishments in Arizona